In mathematics, the trace field of a linear group is the field generated by the traces of its elements. It is mostly studied for Kleinian and Fuchsian groups, though related objects are used in the theory of lattices in Lie groups, often under the name field of definition.

Fuchsian and Kleinian groups

Trace field and invariant trace fields for Fuchsian groups 

The invariant trace field of Fuchsian groups is stable under taking commensurable groups. This is not the case for the trace field; in particular the trace field is in general different from the invariant trace field.

Quaternion algebras for Fuchsian groups 

Let  be a Fuchsian group and  its trace field. The algebra  is then as simple as possible, more precisely:

As for trace fields, the former is not the same for all groups in the same commensurability class but the latter is.

If  is an arithmetic Fuchsian group then  and  together are a number field and quaternion algebra from which a group commensurable to  may be derived.

Kleinian groups 

The theory for Kleinian groups (discrete subgroups of ) is mostly similar as that for Fuchsian groups. One big difference is that the trace field of a group of finite covolume is always a number field.

Trace fields and fields of definition for subgroups of Lie groups

Definition 

When considering subgroups of general Lie groups (which are not necessarily defined as a matrix groups) one has to use a linear representation of the group to take traces of elements. The most natural one is the adjoint representation. It turns out that for applications it is better, even for groups which have a natural lower-dimensional linear representation (such as the special linear groups ), to always define the trace field using the adjoint representation. Thus we have the following definition, originally due to Ernest Vinberg, who used the terminology "field of definition".

Let  be a Lie group and  a subgroup.

The trace field for lattices 

Let  be a semisimple Lie group and  a lattice. Then local rigidity implies the following result.

The field  is a number field. 

For Fuchsian groups the field  defined above is equal to its invariant trace field. For Kleinian groups they are the same if we use the adjoint representation over the complex numbers.

Notes

References 

Algebraic groups